The following is an alphabetical list of articles related to Australia.

A

Adelaide
Alfred Deakin
Andrew Fisher
Aquaculture in Australia
Arthur Fadden
Arthur Phillip
 Australia
Australian:
Australian actors
Australian archaeology
Australian birds
Australian Broadcasting Corporation
Australian Capital Territory
Australian Constitutional history
Australian cuisine
Australian Dollar
Australian electoral system
Australian English
Australian fauna
Australian Fellowship of Faith Churches and Ministers International,
Australian flora
Australian Football League
Australian Greens Party
Australian hardcore
Australian House of Representatives
Australian Labor Party
Australian literature
Australian nationality law
Australian public holidays
Australian rules football
Australian Senate
 Australians
 States and territories of Australia

B

 Banksia
 Belfast Coastal Reserve
 Belinda (film)
Ben Chifley
Bennelong
 Bill Hayden
Billy Hughes
 Black Saturday bushfires (February 2009 in Victoria)
 Bland Oak
 Bob Hawke
 Brisbane

C

 Cairns
 Campdrafting
 Canberra
 Carbon capture and storage in Australia
 Carbon Pollution Reduction Scheme
 Central Coast
 Chain Valley Colliery
 Charles Kingsford Smith
 Christ Watson
 Cinema of Australia
 City West Housing
 Climate change in Australia
 Coal in Australia
 Coal mining in Australia
 Commonwealth Heritage
 Commonwealth of Australia Constitution Act
 Communications in Australia
 Constitution of Australia
 Contribution to global warming by Australia
 Convicts in Australia
 Council of Australian Humanist Societies
 COVID-19 pandemic in Australia
 CSIRO
 Culture of Australia

D

Darwin
Date and time notation in Australia
 Demographics of Australia
 Deserts of Australia
 Diminutives in Australian English
 Don Bradman
 Drought in Australia

E

Earle Page
Economy of Australia
Edmund Barton
 Effects of global warming on Australia
 Electoral systems of the Australian states and territories
 Energy policy of Australia
 Energy Sources in Victoria
 Environment of Australia
 Eucalyptus

F

 Fairfield Showground
 Feed-in tariffs in Australia
 Foreign relations of Australia
 Forests of Australia
Frank Forde

G

 Garnaut Climate Change Review
Geelong
George Reid
 Gender inequality in Australia
 Geography of Australia
 Geology of Australia
 Geothermal energy exploration in Central Australia
Gold Coast
Government of Australia
 Governor-General of Australia
 Grand Final
 Great Barrier Reef

H

 High Court of Australia
 Histology Group of Victoria
 History of Australia
 History of Australia before 1901
 History of Australia since 1901
 History of Western Australia
Harold Holt
Hobart
 Hospitals in Australia
 Human rights in Australia

I

 IDS Enterprise Systems
 Indigenous Australians
 List of Australian inventions
 Indonesia Project (ANU)
 IPP-SHR
 ITCRA.

J

James Cook
James Scullin
John Curtin
John Dawkins
John Dawkins (South Australian politician)
John Gorton
John Howard
 John Kerin
John McEwen
Joseph Cook
Joseph Lyons
 Julia Gillard
Julian Assange

K

 Kangaroo
 Kangaroo paw
Kata Tjuta
 Kevin Rudd

L

 Australian Labor Party
 LGBT rights in Australia
 Liberal Party of Australia
 List of Australians in international prisons
 List of cities in Australia
 List of people who have walked across Australia
 List of political parties in Australia
 List of proposed coal-fired power stations in Australia
 List of cities and towns in South Australia
 List of Western Australian towns
 List of wind farms in Australia
 List of wettest known tropical cyclones in Australia

M

 Major Street-basketball Foundation
Malcolm Turnbull
 Melaleuca
 Melbourne
 Melocco and Moore
 Metrication in Australia
 Michael Jeffery
 Military of Australia
 Military history of Australia during World War I
 Military history of Australia during World War II
 Mining in Australia
 Mitigation of global warming in Australia
 Monkey Mia
Mosie Burton
 Music of Australia

N

 National Basketball League
 National Party of Australia
 National Sorry Day
 Native Plants
 Newcastle
 New South Wales
 North Australia
 Northern Territory
 NSW Minerals Council
 Northmead

O

One Nation Party (Pauline Hanson's One Nation)

P

 Paul Keating
 Pauline Hanson's One Nation
 Parliament of Australia, Perth
Perth
 Photovoltaic engineering in Australia
 Pipeline Authority Act, Plants
 Politics of Australia
 Prime Minister of Australia
 Prisons
 Prospect Hill
 Protected areas of Australia

Q

 Queensland
 Queensland Telugu Association

R

 Renewable energy commercialization in Australia
 Renewable energy in Australia
 Republicanism in Australia
 Revenue stamps of Australia
 Revenue stamps of the Australian Capital Territory
 Revenue stamps of New South Wales
 Revenue stamps of the Northern Territory
 Revenue stamps of Queensland
 Revenue stamps of South Australia
 Revenue stamps of Tasmania
 Revenue stamps of Victoria
 Revenue stamps of Western Australia
 Road transport in Australia
Robert Menzies

S

 SAFTAG
Scott Morrison
 Seafood in Australia
 Seven Network
Simpson Desert
 Site of Ficus superba var. henneana tree
 South Australia
 Sydney
 Sydney Central Courier
 Schapelle Corby
 Solar Cities in Australia
 Solar hot water in Australia
 Solar power in Australia
 Solar power plants in Central Australia
 Solar power station in Victoria
 Solar thermal energy in Australia
Stanley Bruce
Sunshine Coast
Shipwrecks of Western Australia

T

 Taronga Zoo
 Tasmania
 Television in Australia
 Time in Australia
 Thomas Keneally
 Transportation in Australia
 Tent boxing
Townsville

U

 Uluru
 Uluṟu-Kata Tjuṯa National Park

V

 Victoria
 Visa policy of Australia
 Visa requirements for Australian citizens

W

 Waste management in Australia
 Water security in Australia
 Western Australia
 Whaling in Australia
William McMahon
 Wind power in Australia
 Wind power in South Australia
 Wollongong

X

 Xantippe, Western Australia
 XXXX (beer)

Y

 Yarra Valley
 Yarra River

Z

 Zetland

Search 
Search all pages with prefix

 All pages with titles beginning with Australia
 All pages with titles beginning with Australian

Search all pages with title

 All pages with titles containing Australia
 All pages with titles containing Australian

See also

Outline of Australia
Lists of country-related topics
International rankings of Australia
Commonwealth of Nations

 
Australia